Robert 'Iain' Higgins (born 14 September 1976) is a cricket administrator and former professional rugby league player who played in the 1990s and 2000s. He currently serves as the chief executive officer of USA Cricket and previously served as the chief operating officer of International Cricket Council.

International honours
Robert 'Iain' Higgins won caps for Scotland while at London Broncos, and Hunslet Hawks 1997...2001 1-cap + 1-cap (sub).

References

External links
Hornets sting champions
Super Scots stun France
Woodsy on… London Broncos

1976 births
Living people
English rugby league players
Hunslet R.L.F.C. players
London Broncos players
Place of birth missing (living people)
Rugby league centres
Rugby league second-rows
Scotland national rugby league team players